The Gampaha Wickramarachchi University of Indigenous Medicine, is a public university located in Yakkala, Sri Lanka. It was established by Ayurveda Cakrawarti Pandit G.P. Wickramarachchi in 1928 as the Gampaha Sidayurveda Vidyalaya and in 1982 it was incorporated as Gampaha Wickramarachchi Ayurveda Vidyalaya under the Ministry of Indigenous Medicine. 

On 4 March 2021, the institute was officially launched as the 16th University of Sri Lanka by president Gotabaya Rajapaksa.

History 

In 1929, Ayurveda Cakrawarti Pandit G.P. Wickramarachchi commenced the Gampaha Sidayurveda Vidyalaya as a center of learning of Sidhayurveda tradition of medicine. It was located in his personal land in Yakkala to provide knowledge and competence in herbal drug preparation and cikitsa to traditional physicians. Drug manufacturing unit, hospital and herbal garden of rare collection of plants were the valuable resources available to the institute at the inception of the Institute.

By recognizing the emerging trends in Ayurveda medicine and its tremendous contribution to national health sector, the vidyalaya was declared as state recognized institute in 1951, making its diploma holders eligible to in state sector Ayurveda hospitals. In 1982 Vidyalaya was incorporated as Gampaha Wickramarachchi Ayurveda Institute under the Ministry of Indigenous Medicine by the parliamentary act No 30, in 1982. In 1995, it was uplifted to the status of a university institute.

Academics 

The institute's academic staff is allocated to the five academic departments based on their specialization and teaching expertise as below;

 Department of Ayurveda Basic Principles
 Department of Dravyaguna 
 Department of Kaumarabruthya & Stree Roga
 Department of Chikitsa
 Department of Shalya Shalakya

Undergraduate programs 

The Gampaha Wickramarachchi Ayurveda Institute offers the Bachelor of Ayurveda Medicine and Surgery (BAMS) degree, a six-year course including one-year internship training in state hospitals.

Postgraduate programs 

The Gampaha Wickramarachchi Ayurveda Institute offers following postgraduate diplomas and master's degrees across disciplines in Kayacikitsa, Panchakarma and management and administration of Ayurveda institutions.

Postgraduate diplomas 
 Postgraduate Diploma in Management and Administration of Ayurveda Institutions

Master's degrees 
 Master of Science in Kāyacikitsā
 Master of Science in Pañcakarma
 Master of Science in Management and Administration of Ayurveda Institutions

Other programs 
 Diploma In Yoga And Relaxation (DYR)
 Diploma in Ayurveda Pharmaceuticals
 Certificate Course in Yoga and Relaxation Techniques(CCYR)
 Certificate Course in Ayurveda Beauty Culture
 Certificate Course in Ultrasound Scanning

Gampaha Wickramarachchi Ayurveda Teaching Hospital 

Gampaha Wickramarachchi Sidhayurveda Medical College establish in 1929 by Pandit G.P Wickramarachchi with the aims of improving Ayurveda Medicine and provided treated freely. In 1984 it was upgraded to the hospital and on 27 February 2008. it was affiliated by the Department of Ayurveda. At present this hospital has four wards that can accommodate 120 patients. In addition there is an out patients department and a pharmacy. This Ayurveda Teaching hospital provides Teaching and training facilities to undergraduate Medical student of the Gampaha Wickramarachchi Ayurveda Institute.

See also
Sri Lankan traditional medicine
University of Kelaniya
Faculties and institutions of University of Colombo
Education in Sri Lanka
University Grants Commission (Sri Lanka)
Medical school
List of medical schools in Asia
Ayurveda
Alternative medicine
Traditional medicine

References

Statutory boards of Sri Lanka
Universities in Sri Lanka
Ayurvedic colleges in Sri Lanka